Mario Francesco Batali (born September 19, 1960) is an American chef, writer, and former restaurateur. Batali co-owned restaurants in New York City; Las Vegas; Los Angeles; Newport Beach, California; Boston; Singapore; Westport, Connecticut; and New Haven, Connecticut. Batali has appeared on the Food Network, on shows such as Molto Mario and Iron Chef America, on which he was one of the featured "Iron Chefs". In 2017, the restaurant review site Eater revealed multiple accusations of sexual misconduct against Batali and, in March 2019, he sold all his restaurant holdings.

Early life 
Batali was born in Seattle on September 19, 1960, to Marilyn (LaFramboise) and Armandino Batali, who founded Seattle's Salumi restaurant in 2006. His father is of Italian descent and his mother is of part French-Canadian ancestry. Batali attended Rutgers University in New Brunswick, New Jersey, while working as a cook at the pub/restaurant Stuff Yer Face.

In 1994, he married Susi Cahn and together they have two sons. Batali is the son-in-law of Miles and Lillian Cahn, founders of Coach Inc. Batali's brother Dana Batali was Director of Pixar RenderMan development from 2001 to 2015.

Career 
At 29, Batali was a sous chef at the Four Seasons Biltmore after previously working as a sous chef for the then Four Seasons Clift Hotel San Francisco (since 1995, known as "The Clift", under changed ownership). Early in his career, Batali worked with chef Jeremiah Tower at his San Francisco restaurant Stars. Stars was open from 1984 until 1999 and is considered one of the birthplaces of the institution of the celebrity chef. Batali appeared in the Food Network show Molto Mario which aired from 1996 to 2004. The show made Batali a household name and popularized the Food Network.

In 1998, Batali, Joe Bastianich, and Lidia Bastianich formed the B&B Hospitality Group, also known as Batali & Bastianich Hospitality Group. The flagship restaurant for B&B is Babbo Ristorante e Enoteca in New York City which has a Michelin star.

Batali was a co-host of the ABC daytime talk show The Chew from its premiere in 2011 until 2017.

In 2012, a lawsuit was settled by Batali (and B&B) with 117 members of the restaurant staff, who alleged that the Batali organization had skimmed a percentage of the tip pools in his restaurants over a period of years.

Philanthropy and social activism 
Batali is a critic of hydraulic fracturing, commonly known as fracking, a method of natural gas extraction. He has signed onto the cause of Chefs for the Marcellus, whose mission is to "protect [New York's] regional foodshed from the dangers of hydraulic fracturing for natural gas (fracking)." In May 2013, Batali co-wrote an opinion article with chef Bill Telepan for the New York Daily News, in which the two wrote that "Fracking ... could do serious damage to [New York's] agricultural industry and hurt businesses, like ours, that rely on safe, healthy, locally sourced foods." Batali was the subject of a 2007 book titled Heat by Bill Buford which detailed his philosophy to various aspects of social activism, as well as cooking and life.

Batali served as an ambassador and on the board of directors for The Lunchbox Fund, a non-profit organization which provides a daily meal to students of township schools in Soweto, South Africa. In December 2017, Batali stepped down from his role with the organization in response to sexual misconduct allegations against him.

In 2008, Batali and his wife Susi Cahn founded the Mario Batali Foundation, funding various children's educational programs and pediatric disease research.

He supports the practice of Transcendental Meditation through the David Lynch Foundation.

Cooking philosophy 
In a 2012 interview, Batali said that good Italian cooking was characterized by simplicity, an insight he attributed to his time working at a restaurant in Borgo Capanne, Italy.

Sexual misconduct allegations 

On December 11, 2017, restaurant news website Eater reported that four women accused Batali of sexual harassment and sexual assault. By the following day, four more women had come forward. Batali took a leave of absence from his position at the management company Batali & Bastianich Hospitality Group. Producers of ABC's The Chew asked him to step aside temporarily, while his fellow co-hosts publicly addressed the allegations on air, and he was fired from the show on December 14, 2017.

Food Network halted plans to release episodes of his television show Molto Mario after the allegations. Target announced it pulled Batali's pasta sauces and cookbooks out of sales.

In May 2018, more accusations of sexual assault against Batali were aired on an episode of 60 Minutes, and the New York Police Department confirmed it was investigating Batali for his past behavior, including an alleged assault that took place at The Spotted Pig, a restaurant where Batali was an investor. Batali denied an allegation of sexual assault, but said "My past behavior has been deeply inappropriate and I am sincerely remorseful for my actions." Days later, Batali's company B&B Hospitality Group announced it would be closing its three Las Vegas Strip restaurants after the Las Vegas Sands Corp. terminated the companies' relationship.

In January 2019, New York City police declined to charge Batali over two alleged sexual assaults in his New York City restaurants due to insufficient evidence.

In March 2019, Batali surrendered ownership of his stakes in Batali & Bastianich Hospitality Group, a partnership between Batali and the Bastianich family, including Joe and Lidia Bastianich. He also sold his minority ownership in Eataly, an Italian food marketplace. The Bastianiches said B&B Hospitality Group's name will change. Batali was the first chef to surrender ownerships in all his restaurants after reports of sexual misconduct.

In July 2021, Batali, Bastianich, and their former restaurant company agreed to a settlement in the New York state case that was under investigation by the Attorney General of New York wherein they would pay $600,000 to more than 20 former employees (men and women) of three restaurants in Manhattan.

Trial and acquittal
In May 2019, Batali was charged with indecent assault and battery in Boston. In court, the accuser alleged that Batali had groped her in April 2017 at a bar in Boston. Batali pleaded not guilty and chose a bench trial.

On May 10, 2022, Batali was acquitted in Boston Municipal Court by a judge who ruled that Batali's conduct during the alleged incident was "not befitting of a public person of his stature" but agreed with the defense's arguments that his accuser had credibility issues and was motivated by financial gain to make her accusation.

Television and movie credits

Awards
 1998 – "Best New Restaurant of 1998" from the James Beard Foundation for "Babbo Ristorante e Enoteca"
 1999 – "Man of the Year" in GQ's chef category
 2001 – D'Artagnan Cervena Who's Who of Food & Beverage in America
 2002 – "Best Chef: New York City" from the James Beard Foundation 
 2004 – Three Stars from The New York Times for "Babbo Ristorante e Enoteca" from Ruth Reichl.
 2005 – "All-Clad Cookware Outstanding Chef Award" from the James Beard Foundation (national award)
 2008 – One Michelin star, Babbo Ristorante e Enoteca, Michelin Guide
 2008 – "Best Restaurateur" for Joe Bastianich/Mario Batali for Babbo Ristorante e Enoteca from the James Beard Foundation.
 Culinary Hall of Fame Induction.

Works
 Mario Batali Simple Italian Food: Recipes from My Two Villages (1998), 
 Mario Batali Holiday Food: Family Recipes for the Most Festive Time of the Year (2000), 
 Vino Italiano: The Regional Wines of Italy (contributor) (2002), 
 The Babbo Cookbook (2002), 
 The Artist's Palate (foreword) (2003), 
 Molto Italiano: 327 Simple Italian Recipes to Cook at Home (2005), 
 Mario Tailgates NASCAR Style (2006), 
 Spain...A Culinary Road Trip (2008), written with Gwyneth Paltrow, and Julia Turshen. 
 Italian Grill (2008), written with Judith Sutton. 
 Molto Gusto: Easy Italian Cooking (2010), written with Mark Ladner. 
 Molto Batali: Simple Family Meals from My Home to Yours (2011), 
 America – Farm to Table: Simple, Delicious Recipes Celebrating Local Farmers written with Jim Webster
 Mediterranean Summer, A Season on France's Côte d/Azur and Italy's Costa Bella (2007), written by David Shalleck and Erol Munuz  Contributor Foreword by Mario Batali

Batali is also a main subject of Bill Buford's book Heat: An Amateur's Adventures as Kitchen Slave, Line Cook, Pasta-Maker, and Apprentice to a Dante-Quoting Butcher in Tuscany (2007)

References

External links

 
 Biography on Food Network's site
 Mario Batali at the Chef and Restaurant Database
 

1960 births
20th-century American male writers
21st-century American male writers
American male chefs
American people of French-Canadian descent
American people of Italian descent
American restaurateurs
American television chefs
Alumni of Le Cordon Bleu
Chefs from New Jersey
Chefs from New York City
Chefs from Seattle
Chefs of Italian cuisine
Food Network chefs
Head chefs of Michelin starred restaurants
James Beard Foundation Award winners
Living people
People acquitted of sex crimes
People from Seattle
Rutgers University alumni
Writers from New Brunswick, New Jersey
Writers from New York City
Writers from Seattle